Jormas was a Finnish pop band in the 1960s. They had previously appeared as the Beatmakers, but were renamed by their manager Jorma Weneskoski. They were active from 1965 - 1968. Line up in 1965 was Raul Wikström (vocals), Pepe Willberg (vocals, guitar), Seppo Keurulainen (lead guitar).

Singles discography 

 Mr. Tambourine Man / New Orleans (1965)
 The Locomotion / Go Now (1965)
 Please Don't Go / Days, Nights (1966) 
 Please, Please, Please / Go Now (1966)
 Saat miehen kyyneliin / California Dreamin' (1966) 
 Taivas vain tietää / Mennä voit (1966)
 Rööperiin / Kuin yö (1967)
 Luokses palaan taas / Riski Riitta (1967)
 Kenties, kenties / Alusta mä kaiken alkaisin (1968) 
 Tomorrow Is Here / Goin' Out Of My Head / Can't Take My Eyes Of You (1968)
 Se Onnistuu / Elää (1968)

Albums discography 

 Jormas (1966)
 Sincerely! (1968)
 Saat miehen Rööperiin (a compilation, 2001)

External links 

Jormas @ Back to the Sixties
Pepe Willberg discography

Finnish musical groups